TBE may refer to:

 TBE buffer, a buffer solution containing a mixture of Tris base, boric acid and EDTA
 The Best... Ever!, a series of compilation albums
 The Butterfly Effect, a 2004 American psychological thriller film
 Teledyne Brown Engineering, a company owned by the American industrial conglomerate Teledyne Technologies
 Terabit Ethernet, projected future speeds of Ethernet above 100 Gbit/s
 Tetrabromoethane, a halogenated hydrocarbon
 Tick-borne encephalitis, a viral infectious disease involving the central nervous system
 Toronto Board of Education, the former secular school district serving the pre-merged city of Toronto